The Transport Act 1968 (1968 c.73) was an Act of the Parliament of the United Kingdom. The main provisions made changes to the structure of nationally owned bus companies, created passenger transport authorities and executives to take over public transport in large conurbations.

National Bus Company
The Act formed, from 1 January 1969, the National Bus Company by merging the bus operating companies of the government-owned Transport Holding Company with those of the privately owned BET. NBC operated bus services throughout England and Wales outside of large cities, although independent operators still thrived in many rural areas.

Scottish Transport Group
The Scottish Transport Group was also formed at the beginning of 1969. It combined the state-owned Scottish Bus Group and Caledonian Steam Packet Company shipping line.

Passenger transport authorities and executives
The Act also allowed the formation of passenger transport authorities to co-ordinate and operate public transport in large conurbations. The authorities were to be made up of councilors from the various local authorities in the area, while the executives were to be the operators of public transport: for the most part taking over the existing local authority bus fleets.
Following consultation the following PTAs/PTEs were established under the Act:
West Midlands on 1 October 1969
SELNEC (South East Lancashire North East Cheshire) on 1 November 1969
Merseyside on 1 December 1969
Tyneside on 1 January 1970
Greater Glasgow on 1 June 1973 (also operated the Glasgow Subway)

Subsidies for socially necessary but unremunerative railways
Section 39 of the Act introduced the first government subsidies for railways which were unremunerative for British Rail but deemed socially necessary. Grants could be paid where three conditions were met: (i) the line was unremunerative, (ii) it is desirable for social or economic reasons for the passenger services to continue, and (iii) it is financially unreasonable to expect British Rail to provide those services without a grant.

Waterways
The Act made changes to the use of facilities controlled by the state-owned British Waterways. Reflecting the decline in the use of canals and rivers for freight distribution, waterways were divided into three categories, as envisaged by the White Paper entitled British Waterways: Recreation and Amenity which was published in September 1967.
 
Commercial waterways would be principally available for commercial use and the carriage of freight.
Cruising waterways, would be available for leisure cruising, fishing and other recreational purposes.
Remainder waterways, would be maintained to the minimum levels possible, consistent with requirements for public health, and the retention of amenity and safety.

An important provision for remainder waterways allowed them to be transferred to or maintained by local authorities. The Act recognized the value of the waterway network for leisure use, and set up the Inland Waterways Amenity Advisory Council (IWAAC) to give advice to both government and British Waterways on all matters concerned with the use of the network for recreation. In May 1968 the IWAAC had been set up as an informal body prior to the passing of the Act, and the 22 members became part of a statutory body on 18 November 1968, as a result of the Act.

Vehicle testing and driving hours
The Act made changes to the MOT vehicle test. Previously vehicles had been liable to annual testing ten years after first registration. This was reduced to three years from first registration. The Act also introduced maximum driving hours for goods drivers and also allowed the introduction of the tachograph to record driving periods despite the resistance of the trade unions, which called them 'the spy in the cab'.

See also

Canals of the United Kingdom
History of the British canal system

References

Transport Act 1968 (1968 c.73)

Bibliography

United Kingdom Acts of Parliament 1968
Former nationalised industries of the United Kingdom
Railway Acts
1968 in transport
Transport policy in the United Kingdom
History of transport in the United Kingdom